Hermann Pohlmann (26 June 1894 – 7 July 1991) was a German aerospace engineer.

He was the principal designer of the Junkers Ju 87 Stuka, a dive bomber used during World War II, before becoming Deputy Chief Designer at Blohm & Voss.

After the war, when the Hamburger Flugzeugbau (HFB) was recreated in 1956, he was appointed Chief Designer and led the team which designed the HFB 320 Hansa Jet.

Published works
 Pohlmann, Hermann (1982). Chronik Eines Flugzeugwerkes 1932–1945, Motorbuch. . The story of Hamburger Flugzeugbau and the Blohm & Voss aircraft subsidiary.

References
 Amtmann, Hans (1988). The Vanishing Paperclips. Monogram.
 Griehl, Manfred (2001). Junkers Ju 87 Stuka. Airlife Publishing/Motorbuch, London/Stuttgart. 

German aerospace engineers
Junkers people
1894 births
1991 deaths
Engineers from Hamburg